Stay with Me is a  novel written by Nigerian author Ayọ̀bámi Adébáyọ̀. It was first published in 2017, by Canongate Books in the UK and subsequently by Alfred A. Knopf in the US.

Reception 
Stay with Me was first published in 2017 in the UK by Canongate Books, to critical acclaim, and prior to publication, had been shortlisted for the Kwani? Manuscript Project, a prize for unpublished fiction, of which the series editor was Ellah Wakatama Allfrey.

Michiko Kakutani in her review of the novel for The New York Times described Adébáyọ̀ as "an exceptional storyteller", adding: "She writes not just with extraordinary grace but with genuine wisdom about love and loss and the possibility of redemption. She has written a powerfully magnetic and heartbreaking book." The book was published in the US by Alfred A. Knopf and in Nigeria by Ouida Books. It has been translated into more than 18 languages. It was selected as notable book of the year by several publications, including The New York Times, The Economist, The Wall Street Journal and The Guardian.

Stay with Me was shortlisted for the Wellcome Book Prize, the Baileys Women's Prize for Fiction, as well as for the 9mobile Prize for Literature, which it went on to win in 2019. It was also longlisted for the International Dublin Literary Award and the Dylan Thomas Prize.

In 2020, the Prix Les Afriques was awarded to Reste Avec Moi, the French edition of Stay with Me, translated by Josette Chicheportiche and published in 2019 by Charleston Editions.

References 

2017 debut novels
2017 Nigerian novels
Canongate Books books
Alfred A. Knopf books